Hysteroconcha is a genus of saltwater clams, marine bivalve molluscs in the subfamily Callocardiinae of the family Veneridae, the Venus clams.

Species
 Hysteroconcha brevispinosa (G. B. Sowerby II, 1851)
 Hysteroconcha dione (Linnaeus, 1758)
 Hysteroconcha lupanaria (Lesson, 1831)
 Hysteroconcha multispinosa (G. B. Sowerby II, 1851)
 Hysteroconcha rosea (Broderip & G. B. Sowerby I, 1829)
Synonyms
 Hysteroconcha alternata (Broderip, 1835): synonym of Lamelliconcha alternata (Broderip, 1835)
 Hysteroconcha callicomata (Dall, 1902): synonym of Lamelliconcha callicomata (Dall, 1902)
 Hysteroconcha circinata (Born, 1778): synonym of Lamelliconcha circinata (Born, 1778)
 Hysteroconcha concinna (G. B. Sowerby I, 1835): synonym of Lamelliconcha concinna (G. B. Sowerby I, 1835)
 Hysteroconcha dautzenbergi Prashad, 1932: synonym of Lioconcha philippinarum (Hanley, 1844)
 Hysteroconcha hesperia (Berry, 1960): synonym of Lamelliconcha alternata (Broderip, 1835)
 Hysteroconcha paytensis (d'Orbigny, 1845): synonym of Lamelliconcha paytensis (d'Orbigny, 1845)
 Hysteroconcha tortuosa (Broderip, 1835): synonym of Lamelliconcha tortuosa (Broderip, 1835)
 Hysteroconcha unicolor (G. B. Sowerby I, 1835): synonym of Lamelliconcha unicolor (G. B. Sowerby I, 1835)
 Hysteroconcha vinacea (Olsson, 1961): synonym of Lamelliconcha vinacea Olsson, 1961

References

 Coan, E. V.; Valentich-Scott, P. (2012). Bivalve seashells of tropical West America. Marine bivalve mollusks from Baja California to northern Peru. 2 vols, 1258 pp

External links
 

 
Bivalve genera